The 2005–06 Biathlon World Cup was a multi-race tournament over a season of biathlon, organised by the International Biathlon Union. The 2006 Winter Olympics were part of the Biathlon World Cup. The season lasted from 26 November 2005 to 26 March 2006.

The men's overall World Cup was won by Norway's Ole Einar Bjørndalen, while Kati Wilhelm of Germany claimed the women's overall World Cup.

Calendar 
Below is the World Cup calendar for the 2005–06 season.

World Cup Podium

Men

Women

Men's team

Women's team

Mixed

Standings: Men

Overall 

Final standings after 26 races.

Individual 

Final standings after 3 races.

Sprint 

Final standings after 10 races.

Pursuit 

Final standings after 8 races.

Mass Start 

Final standings after 5 races.

Relay 

Final standings after 5 races.

Nation 

Final standings after 19 races.

Standings: Women

Overall 

Final standings after 26 races.

Individual 

Final standings after 3 races.

Sprint 

Final standings after 10 races.

Pursuit 

Final standings after 8 races.

Mass Start 

Final standings after 5 races.

Relay 

Final standings after 5 races.

Nation 

Final standings after 19 races.

Medal table

Achievements
Victory in this World Cup (all-time number of victories in parentheses)

Men
 , 8 (63) first places
 , 3 (33) first places
 , 3 (15) first places
 , 2 (3) first places
 , 2 (2) first places
 , 1 (38) first place
 , 1 (9) first place
 , 1 (9) first place
 , 1 (2) first place
 , 1 (2) first place
 , 1 (2) first place
 , 1 (1) first place
 , 1 (1) first place

Women
 , 6 (15) first places
 , 6 (6) first places
 , 3 (9) first places
 , 2 (15) first places
 , 2 (5) first places
 , 2 (2) first places
 , 1 (30) first place
 , 1 (22) first place
 , 1 (21) first place
 , 1 (6) first place
 , 1 (1) first place

Retirements
The following notable biathletes retired after the 2005–06 season:

References

External links 
 Season statistics at Biathlonworld.com

World Cup
World Cup
Biathlon World Cup